Minister of the Colonies refers to a government minister responsible for a nation's imperial colonies. Examples include:

 Belgium – Minister of the Colonies
 France – Minister of the Overseas
 Germany – List of German colonial ministers
 Italy – Minister of the Colonies
 United Kingdom – Secretary of State for the Colonies

See also 
 Ministry of the Colonies (disambiguation)

 
Colonialism